Vaidhyanathaswamy Santhanam (31 July 1925 – 5 June 2019) was an Indian cotton scientist who worked for the Food and Agriculture Organization of the United Nations as a long term resident expert for cotton and project leader in Myanmar. He had served as a short term consultant to Vietnam as well. He was chairman of the expert review team of the Southern India Mills Cotton Development and Research Association from November 2009 to March 2010. He was also the author/co-author of over 110 publications, including books and book chapters on cotton.

Education and personal life
Santhanam was born on 31 July 1925 at Tiruvarur in Tamil Nadu. He graduated from the Agricultural College, Coimbatore in the year 1946. He earned masters and doctorate degrees in plant breeding and genetics, from the Madras University.

Starting his professional career at the Cotton Breeding station of the same college, he had an illustrious professional career as a cotton research scientist with the Indian Council of Agricultural Research (ICAR).He was the first National Coordinator for the All India Coordinated Cotton Improvement Project under ICAR (1967–75). During his tenure, he had established a solid foundation for cooperative research among all the cotton growing states of India. In recognition of the work done by the cotton group headed by him, ICAR conferred the council's very first award for team research to them in 1975.

Dr. Santhanam served the Food and Agriculture Organization in 1975 to 1983 as longtime resident expert on Cotton and Project Team Leader in Myanmar. He served them as short term consultant (Senior Advisor) in Myanmar and Vietnam during 1984 to 1987.

Santhanam died on 5 June 2019, at the age of 93.

Scientific work
Introduced the concept of ideal plant type for increasing productivity and early maturity in the Indian cotton breeding program; contributed to development of Indian long staple cotton varieties. Improved agronomic practices in Burma for increasing its cotton production under the auspices of projects funded under UNDP.Dr.Santhanam's work on Cotton in Myanmar was commended by the Director General of the FAO for his "direct contribution to the 50% increase in production between the years 1975 and 1982" and placed on record his appreciation for the same.

Important publications
Breeding procedures for cotton (1967) ICAR technical Bulletin series, no. 10.
Cotton (1974) Evolutionary studies in field crops, Cambridge University Press, pp. 89–100.
Agri-history of Cotton in India (1997) Asian Agri-history, 1:4,235-251
Emerging trends in conventional breeding for cotton improvement (2004) Proc. Int. Symp. UAS Dharwad/ICAR, 1–5.

Awards and accolades
 Rafi Ahmed Kidwai Memorial prize from the Indian Council of Agricultural Research (ICAR)  (1967)
 Fellow of Indian Academy of Sciences (1974).
 Fellow of Indian Society for Cotton Improvement, Mumbai (2002)
 Life Time Achievement Award from the University of Agricultural Sciences, Dharwad (2004)
 Life Time Achievement Award from the Cotton Development and Research Association, Haryana (2005)

Notes

External links
Cotton history India by Dr. V.S and Dr.V. Sundaram
 Seminar on Improved Crop Production Strategies - CICR newsletter
Extra Long Staple Cotton Vision Statement Acknowledgement

1925 births
2019 deaths
Indian agronomists
Indian expatriates in Myanmar
People from Tiruvarur district
Scientists from Tamil Nadu